The Tlingit are an indigenous people of Alaska. 

Tlingit may also refer to:

Tlingit language
Tlingit alphabet

See also
Tlingit clans
Tlingit cuisine
The Telengits, of Siberia